These are the squads for the countries that played in the 1917 South American Championship. The participating countries were Argentina, Brazil, Chile and Uruguay. The teams played in a single round-robin tournament, earning two points for a win, one point for a draw, and zero points for a loss.

Argentina
Head Coach: n/i

Brazil
Head coach:  Sílvio Lagreca

Chile
Head Coach:  Julián Bartola

Uruguay
Head Coach:  Ramón Platero

Notes

References

Squads

Copa América squads